Hemphillia pantherina is a species of air-breathing land slugs, terrestrial pulmonate gastropod mollusks in the family Arionidae, the roundback slugs.

References

Arionidae
Taxobox binomials not recognized by IUCN